The Ethiopian World Federation Incorporated, (EWF) was a charitable organization established in the United States in 1937. Its aims were to mobilize support for the Ethiopians during the Italian invasion of 1935-41, and to embody the unity of Ethiopians (Black people) home and abroad. Sections were established in other parts of the Americas. Later, the EWF was given charge of an area of land in Ethiopia for housing returning emigrants. EWF sections in different countries became increasingly identified with the African Diaspora movement even though it was originally aimed at African Americans ready to defend the Ethiopians subjects and their empire from the fascist aggressors.

History 
The EWF built on the efforts of African Americans who, in 1936, sent a delegation consisting of three prominent Harlem figures, all leaders of the black organization known as United Aid for Ethiopia. Reverend William Lloyd Imes, Pastor of the prestigious St. James Presbyterian Church, Philip M. Savory of the Victory Insurance Company and co-owner of the New York Amsterdam News, and Cyril M. Philp, secretary of United Aid, sailed to England in the summer of 1936 to speak with Emperor Haile Selassie concerning financial matters. In response, the Emperor empowered his personal physician His Imperial Highness Prince Malaku E. Bayen, Phd., as his personal emissary. Bayen at first worked with United Aid for Ethiopia, but the next year he dissolved that body and founded the EWF to take its place.

EWF was formally established on August 25, 1937, in New York City as The Ethiopian World Federation, Incorporated. It was originally a not-for-profit membership organization, incorporated in the State of New York. By the standards of The Constitution and ByLaws in which it was built on, the relationship of the organization grew stronger with The Ethiopian Orthodox Tewahedo Church. Later it was also registered by the Internal Revenue Service as a 501(c)(4) organization, thus conferring tax-exempt status on the organization and its legal subsidiary bodies.

The main purpose was set out in the following preamble:

The EWF was at first made up primarily of Ethiopian students who came to America to study abroad, after the official coronation of Emperor Haile Selassie. It gained support from the Black community of Harlem, and deprecated the term "Negro" in favour of an African and Ethiopian identity.

The isolationist policy of the United States prevented the participation of  Americans getting involved in what they perceived as being a European affair and didn't want to be sucked into a second world war. This however did not prevent American negroes from seeking other alternatives. Consequentially under the Ethiopian World Federation in 1936 somewhere between 500 and 1,500 black Americans were conscripted into the Second Italo-Ethiopian War on the side of Ethiopia against Benito Mussolini after having adopted Ethiopian citizenship and names. Most notably the Tuskegee Airman  John C. Robinson, the Brown Condor of Chicago. Tensions arose in America which sparked violent controversy between black and Italian Americans at that time. Bayen set up the EWF's newspaper, The Voice of Ethiopia, and led the project of federating the EWF. The first branch of the EWF outside the United States was set up in Kingston, Jamaica, and by 1940 there were EWF chapters in various parts of Latin America and the Caribbean. Bayen died in 1940 and was succeeded as leader by Lij Araya Abebe, then in 1943 by Elks Exalted Ruler Finley Wilson, by which time it had become a Black American organization rather than an Ethiopian-led one.

As a direct result of the support Ethiopia received from black people in the West, mainly at that time African-Americans, during the Italian invasion of 1935–1941, the Emperor in 1948 granted five Gashas (approximately 200 hectares) of land near Shashamane to the EWF for African-Americans in the Diaspora who desired to return to Africa. Many families moved to Shashamane, many of which would later come from Jamaica. Following the assassination of Emperor Haile Selassie I and the events leading up to the Ethiopian Red Terror (Amharic: ቀይ ሽብር ḳäy shəbbər), also known as the Qey Shibir, the Soviet backed communist regime known as Derg appropriated much of the land in 1975, though people still remain to today.

In 1983, the Jamaican branch of the EWF became a political party, the Imperial Ethiopian World Federation, representing the Rastafarian community there.  In 2021, Shashamane Ethiopia the international body of EWF INC, voted Dr. James Winborne as the new International President of the Ethiopian World Federation Incorporated. Ethiopianworldfederationincorporated.org

References

External links
 {http://theethiopianworldfederation.org}
 {https://www.guidestar.org/profile/13-6161605}
 {https://www.globaldiaspora.org}

Foreign charities operating in Ethiopia
Charities based in New York City